Dilip Parameshwar Gaonkar (born 1944) is a Professor in Rhetoric and Public Culture and the Director of Center for Global Culture and Communication at Northwestern University. He is also Executive Director of the Center for Transcultural Studies, an independent scholarly research network concerned with global issues based in Chicago and New York. Gaonkar was closely associated with the influential journal Public Culture from the early 1990s, serving in various editorial capacities: associate editor (1992-2000), executive editor (2000-2009), and editor (2009-2011).

Gaonkar has two main sets of scholarly interests: rhetoric as an intellectual tradition, both its ancient roots and its contemporary mutations; and global modernities and their impact on the political. He has published numerous essays on rhetoric, including "The Idea of Rhetoric in the Rhetoric of Science" that was published along with ten critical responses to the essay in a book, Rhetorical Hermeneutics: Invention and Interpretation in the Age of Science, edited by Alan G. Gross and William Keith (1996). Gaonkar has edited a series books on global cultural politics: Globaizing American Studies (with Brian T. Edwards, 2010), Alternative Modernities (2001), and Disciplinarity and Dissent in Cultural Studies (1995). He has also edited several special issues of journals: “Laclau's On Populist Reason” (with Robert Hariman, for Cultural Studies, 2012), “Cultures of Democracy” (for Public Culture, 2007), “Commitments in a Post-Foundational World” (with Keith Topper, 2005), “Technologies of Public Persuasion” (with Elizabeth Povinelli, 2003), and “New Imaginaries” (with Benjamin Lee, 2002).  He is currently working on two edited volumes: Oxford Handbook on Rhetoric and Political Theory (with Keith Topper) and Distribution of the Sensible: Ranciere on Politics and Aesthetics (with Scott Durham). Gaonkar is also co-writing on a book on populism with Charles Taylor and Craig Calhoun.

Dilip Gaonkar hails from the Ankola region in Karwar district (south of Goa). He is a grandson of SAPA. Gaonkar and Venkanna H. Naik. Gaonkar is married to Sally Ewing, a writer and former Associate Dean of Advising and Student Affairs at Northwestern University's School of Communication.

Academic life

Goankar's doctoral thesis at the University of Pittsburgh was titled Aspects of sophistic pedagogy (1984).
 His prior degrees include M.A. in Theatre (Tufts University), M.A. in Political Science (University of Bombay) and B.A. in Politics and Philosophy (Elphinstone College). Before joining Northwestern, Gaonkar was in the Department of Speech Communication at the University of Illinois in 1989  and then at the University of Wisconsin–Madison.

Awards
Gaonkar has been awarded the National Communication Association's (NCA) Golden Anniversary Monographs Award in 1991 and 1994.

Selected works

Work anthologized

References

External links
 Dilip P. Gaonkar Works
 Northwestern University School of Communication official website

1944 births
American humanities academics
American social sciences writers
Cultural academics
American male writers of Indian descent
American people of Kannada descent
Indian emigrants to the United States
Living people
Northwestern University faculty
Writers from Evanston, Illinois
American rhetoricians
Tufts University School of Arts and Sciences alumni
University of Pittsburgh alumni
University of Mumbai alumni
University of Illinois Urbana-Champaign faculty
American male non-fiction writers